Potassium persulfate is the inorganic compound with the formula K2S2O8. Also known as potassium peroxydisulfate, it is a white solid that is sparingly soluble in cold water, but dissolves better in warm water. This salt is a powerful oxidant, commonly used to initiate polymerizations.

Structure
The sodium and potassium salts are very similar.  In the potasium salt, the O-O distance is 1.495Å.  The individual sulfate groups are tetrahedral, with three short S-O distances near 1.43 and one long S-O bond at 1.65Å.

Preparation
Potassium persulfate can be prepared by electrolysis of a cold solution potassium bisulfate in sulfuric acid at a high current density.
 2 KHSO4 → K2S2O8 + H2

It can also be prepared by adding potassium bisulfate (KHSO4) to a solution of the more soluble salt ammonium peroxydisulfate (NH4)2S2O8. In principle it can be prepared by chemical oxidation of potassium sulfate using fluorine.  Several million kilograms of the ammonium, sodium, and potassium salts of peroxydisulfate are produced annually.

Uses
This salt is used to initiate polymerization of various alkenes leading to commercially important polymers such as styrene-butadiene rubber and polytetrafluoroethylene and related materials. In solution, the dianion dissociates to give radicals:
[O3SO-OSO3]2−      2 [SO4]•−

It is used in organic chemistry as an oxidizing agent, for instance in the Elbs persulfate oxidation of phenols and the Boyland–Sims oxidation of anilines.

As a strong yet stable bleaching agent it also finds use in various hair bleaches and lighteners. Such brief and non-continuous use is normally hazard free, however prolonged contact can cause skin irritation.
It has been used as an improving agent for flour with the E number E922, although it is no longer approved for this use within the EU.

Precautions
The salt is a strong oxidant and is incompatible with organic compounds. Prolonged skin contact can result in irritation.

References

Persulfates
Potassium compounds
Oxidizing agents
Radical initiators